Andrezza "Rtvelo" Martins das Chagas (born August 2, 1977) is a Brazilian beach volleyball player representing Georgia. She is partnered in the 2008 Summer Olympics with Cristine "Saka" Santanna.  Their nicknames mean Georgia in Georgian (Sakartvelo).  Martins and her partner Santanna's most notable win came when they defeated a Russian opponent in the Beijing Olympics.

External links
 
 
 
 

1977 births
Living people
Beach volleyball players at the 2008 Summer Olympics
Brazilian women's beach volleyball players
Beach volleyball players from Georgia (country)
Olympic beach volleyball players of Georgia (country)
People from Manaus
Sportspeople from Amazonas (Brazilian state)